Katy is an unincorporated community in Marion County, West Virginia, United States. Its post office  is closed.

References 

Unincorporated communities in West Virginia
Unincorporated communities in Marion County, West Virginia